John Thomas Jennings,  (19 December 1878 – 20 December 1968) was an Australian politician. Born in Melbourne, he attended state schools before becoming a retailer of dental supplies. He underwent military service from 1899 to 1901 and served in South Africa during the Second Boer War with the Victorian Mounted Rifles. In 1931, he was elected to the Australian House of Representatives as the United Australia Party member for South Sydney in New South Wales. South Sydney was abolished in 1934 and replaced with Watson; Jennings contested Watson and won. He held the seat until 1940, when he was defeated by Labor candidate Max Falstein. Jennings died in 1968.

Between 1928 and 1958 Jennings served as National President of the Australian Dental Trade Association (ADTA), which now trades as the Australian Dental Industry Association (ADIA). He remains that organization's longest serving federal president.

Jennings was the brother of Albert Victor Jennings, founder of the A.V. Jennings building company in Melbourne, Australia, and the uncle of Doug Jennings.

References

1878 births
1968 deaths
20th-century Australian politicians
Australian Members of the Order of the British Empire
Australian military personnel of the Second Boer War
Australian soldiers
Mayors of Randwick
Members of the Australian House of Representatives for South Sydney
Members of the Australian House of Representatives for Watson
United Australia Party members of the Parliament of Australia
Australian dentists